Patrick Henry Pearse (also known as Pádraig or Pádraic Pearse; ; 10 November 1879 – 3 May 1916) was an Irish teacher, barrister, poet, writer, nationalist, republican political activist and revolutionary who was one of the leaders of the Easter Rising in 1916. Following his execution along with fifteen others, Pearse came to be seen by many as the embodiment of the rebellion.

Early life and influences

Pearse, his brother Willie, and his sisters Margaret and Mary Brigid were born at 27 Great Brunswick Street, Dublin, the street that is named after them today. It was here that their father, James Pearse, established a stonemasonry business in the 1850s, a business which flourished and provided the Pearses with a comfortable middle-class upbringing. Pearse's father was a mason and monumental sculptor, and originally a Unitarian from Birmingham in England. His mother, Margaret Brady, was from Dublin, and her father's family from County Meath were native Irish speakers. She was James' second wife; James had two children, Emily and James, from his first marriage (two other children died in infancy). Pearse's maternal grandfather Patrick was a supporter of the 1848 Young Ireland movement, and later a member of the Irish Republican Brotherhood (IRB). Pearse recalled a visiting ballad singer performing republican songs during his childhood; afterwards he went around looking for armed men ready to fight, but finding none, declared sadly to his grandfather that "the Fenians are all dead". His maternal grand-uncle, James Savage, fought in the American Civil War. The Irish-speaking influence of Pearse's grand-aunt Margaret, together with his schooling at the CBS Westland Row, instilled in him an early love for the Irish language and culture.

Pearse grew up surrounded by books. His father had had very little formal education, but was self-educated;  Pearse recalled that at the age of ten he prayed to God, promising Him he would dedicate his life to Irish independence. Pearse's early heroes were ancient Gaelic folk heroes such as Cúchulainn, though in his 30s he began to take a strong interest in the leaders of past republican movements, such as the United Irishmen Theobald Wolfe Tone and Robert Emmet.

Pearse soon became involved in the Gaelic revival. In 1896, at the age of 16, he joined the Gaelic League (Conradh na Gaeilge), and in 1903, at the age of 23, he became editor of its newspaper An Claidheamh Soluis ("The Sword of Light").

In 1900, Pearse was awarded a B.A. in Modern Languages (Irish, English and French) by the Royal University of Ireland, for which he had studied for two years privately and for one at University College Dublin. In the same year, he was enrolled as a Barrister-at-Law at the King's Inns. Pearse was called to the bar in 1901. In 1905, Pearse represented Neil McBride, a poet and songwriter from Feymore, Creeslough, Donegal, who had been fined for having his name displayed in "illegible" writing (i.e. Irish) on his donkey cart. The appeal was heard before the Court of King's Bench in Dublin. It was Pearse's first and only court appearance as a barrister. The case was lost but it became a symbol of the struggle for Irish independence. In his 27 June 1905 An Claidheamh Soluis column, Pearse wrote of the decision, "it was in effect decided that Irish is a foreign language on the same level with Yiddish."

St Enda's

As a cultural nationalist educated by the Irish Christian Brothers, like his younger brother Willie, Pearse believed that language was intrinsic to the identity of a nation. The Irish school system, he believed, raised Ireland's youth to be good Englishmen or obedient Irishmen, and an alternative was needed. Thus for him and other language revivalists saving the Irish language from extinction was a cultural priority of the utmost importance. The key to saving the language, he felt, would be a sympathetic education system. To show the way he started his own bilingual school for boys, St. Enda's School (Scoil Éanna) in Cullenswood House in Ranelagh, a suburb of County Dublin, in 1908. The pupils were taught in both Irish and English. Cullenswood House is now the home of a Gaelscoil, Lios na nÓg.  With the aid of Thomas MacDonagh, Pearse's younger brother Willie Pearse, their mother and both Margaret and Mary Brigid Pearse, along with other (often transient) academics, it soon proved a successful experiment. Pearse did all he planned, and even took students on field trips to the Gaeltacht in the West of Ireland.

Pearse's restless idealism led him in search of an even more idyllic home for his school. He found it in The Hermitage in Rathfarnham, County Dublin, now home to the Pearse Museum. In 1910 Pearse wrote that the Hermitage was an "ideal" location due to the aesthetics of the grounds and that if he could secure it, "the school would be on a level with" the more established schools of the day such as "Clongowes Wood College and Castleknock College". Pearse was also involved in the foundation of Scoil Íde (St Ita's School) for girls, an institution with aims similar to those of St Enda's. However, the new home, while splendidly located in an 18th-century house surrounded by a park and woodlands, caused financial difficulties that almost brought Pearse to disaster. Scoil Íde closed in 1912 after just two years; Pearse strove continually to keep ahead of his debts while doing his best to maintain Scoil Éanna in existence. In February 1914, he went on a fund-raising trip to the United States, where he met John Devoy and Joseph McGarrity, both of whom were impressed by his fervour and supported him in raising sufficient money to secure the continued operation of the boys' school.

The Volunteers and Home Rule
In April 1912 John Redmond leader of the Irish Parliamentary Party, which held the balance of power in the House of Commons committed the government of the United Kingdom to introducing an Irish Home Rule Bill.  Pearse gave the bill a qualified welcome. He was one of four speakers, including Redmond, Joseph Devlin MP, leader of the Northern Nationalists, and Eoin MacNeill a prominent Gaelic Leaguer, who addressed a large Home Rule Rally in Dublin at the end of March 1912.  Speaking in Irish, Pearse said he thought that "a good measure can be gained if we have enough courage", but he warned, "Let the English understand that if we are again betrayed, there shall be red war throughout Ireland."

In November 1913 Pearse was invited to the inaugural meeting of the Irish Volunteers—formed in reaction to the creation of the Ulster Volunteers—whose aim was "to secure and maintain the rights and liberties common to the whole people of Ireland". In an article entitled "The Coming Revolution" (November 1913) Pearse wrote: 

The Home Rule Bill just failed to pass the House of Lords, but the Lords' diminished power under the Parliament Act 1911 meant that the Bill could only be delayed, not stopped. It was placed on the statute books with Royal Assent in September 1914, but its implementation was suspended for the duration of the First World War.

John Redmond feared that his "national authority" might be circumvented by the Volunteers and decided to try to take control of the new movement. Despite opposition from the Irish Republican Brotherhood, the Volunteer Executive agreed to share leadership with Redmond and a joint committee was set up. Pearse was opposed to this and was to write:

The Volunteers split, one of the issues being support for the Allied and British war effort. A majority followed Redmond into the National Volunteers in the belief that this would ensure Home Rule on their return. Pearse, exhilarated by the dramatic events of the European war, wrote in an article in December 1915:

Irish Republican Brotherhood

In December 1913 Bulmer Hobson swore Pearse into the secret Irish Republican Brotherhood (IRB), an organisation dedicated to the overthrow of British rule in Ireland and its replacement with an Irish Republic. He was soon co-opted onto the IRB's Supreme Council by Tom Clarke. Pearse was then one of many people who were members of both the IRB and the Volunteers. When he became the Volunteers' Director of Military Organisation in 1914 he was the highest ranking Volunteer in the IRB membership, and instrumental in the latter's commandeering of the remaining minority of the Volunteers for the purpose of rebellion. By 1915 he was on the IRB's Supreme Council, and its secret Military Council, the core group that began planning for a rising while war raged on the European Western Front.

On 1 August 1915 Pearse gave a graveside oration at the funeral of the Fenian Jeremiah O'Donovan Rossa. He was the first republican to be filmed giving an oration. It closed with the words:

Easter Rising and death

It was Pearse who, on behalf of the IRB shortly before Easter in 1916, issued the orders to all Volunteer units throughout the country for three days of manoeuvres beginning on Easter Sunday, which was the signal for a general uprising. When Eoin MacNeill, the Chief of Staff of the Volunteers, learned what was being planned without the promised arms from Germany, he countermanded the orders via newspaper, causing the IRB to issue a last-minute order to go through with the plan the following day, greatly limiting the numbers who turned out for the rising.

When the Easter Rising eventually began on Easter Monday, 24 April 1916, it was Padraig who read the Proclamation of the Irish Republic from outside the General Post Office, the headquarters of the Rising. Pearse was the person most responsible for drafting the Proclamation, and he was chosen as President of the Republic. After six days of fighting, heavy civilian casualties and great destruction of property, Pearse issued the order to surrender.

Padraig and fourteen other leaders, including his brother Willie, were court-martialled and executed by firing squad. Thomas Clarke, Thomas MacDonagh and Pearse himself were the first of the rebels to be executed, on the morning of 3 May 1916. Pearse was 36 years old at the time of his death. Roger Casement, who had tried unsuccessfully to recruit an insurgent force among Irish-born prisoners of war from the Irish Brigade in Germany, was hanged in London the following August.

Sir John Maxwell, the General Officer commanding the British forces in Ireland, sent a telegram to H. H. Asquith, then Prime Minister, advising him not to return the bodies of the Pearse brothers to their family, saying, "Irish sentimentality will turn these graves into martyrs' shrines to which annual processions will be made, which would cause constant irritation in this country. Maxwell also suppressed a letter from Pearse to his mother, and two poems dated 1 May 1916. He submitted copies of them also to Prime Minister Asquith, saying that some of the content was "objectionable".

Writings

Pearse wrote stories and poems in both Irish and English. His best-known English poems include "The Mother", "The Fool", "The Rebel" and "The Wayfarer". He also wrote several allegorical plays in the Irish language, including The King, The Master, and The Singer. His short stories in Irish include Eoghainín na nÉan ("Eoineen of the Birds"), Íosagán ("Little Jesus"), An Gadaí ("The Thief"), Na Bóithre ("The Roads"), and An Bhean Chaointe ("The Keening Woman"). These were translated into English by Joseph Campbell (in the Collected Works of 1917). Most of his ideas on education are contained in his essay "The Murder Machine". He also wrote many essays on politics and language, notably "The Coming Revolution" and "Ghosts".

Pearse is closely associated with his rendering of the Jacobite sean-nós song, "Oró Sé do Bheatha 'Bhaile", for which he composed republican lyrics.

According to Innti poet and literary critic Louis de Paor, despite Pearse's enthusiasm for the Conamara Theas dialect of Connacht Irish spoken around his summer cottage at Rosmuc in Connemara, he chose to follow the usual practice of the Gaelic revival by writing in Munster Irish, which was considered less Anglicized than other Irish dialects.

Also according to Louis de Paor, Pearse's reading of the radically experimental poetry of Walt Whitman and of the French Symbolists led him to introduce Modernist poetry into the Irish language. As a literary critic, Pearse also left behind a very detailed blueprint for the decolonization of Irish literature, particularly in the Irish language.

Louis De Paor writes that Patrick Pearse was "the most perceptive critic and most accomplished poet," of the early Gaelic revival providing "a sophisticated model for a new literature in Irish that would reestablish a living connection with the pre-colonial Gaelic past while resuming its relationship with contemporary Europe, bypassing the monolithic influence of English."

For these reasons, Louis de Paor has called Pearse's execution by a British Army firing squad after the defeat of the 1916 Easter Rising a catastrophic loss for Modern literature in Irish. This loss only began to be healed during the 1940s by the modernist poetry of Seán Ó Ríordáin, Máirtín Ó Direáin, and Máire Mhac an tSaoi; and by the modernist novels An Béal Bocht by Flann O'Brien and Cré na Cille by Máirtín Ó Cadhain.

Reputation
Largely as a result of a series of political pamphlets that Pearse wrote in the months leading up to the Rising, he soon became recognised as the main voice of the Rising. In the middle decades of the 20th century, Pearse was idolised by Irish nationalists as the supreme idealist of their cause. With the outbreak of conflict in Northern Ireland in 1969, Pearse's legacy was used by the Provisional IRA.

Pearse's ideas have been seen by Sean Farrell Moran as belonging to the context of European cultural history as a part of a rejection of reason by European social thinkers. Additionally, his place within Catholicism, where his orthodoxy was challenged in the early 1970s, has been addressed to suggest that Pearse's theological foundations for his political ideas share in a long-existing tradition in western Christianity.

Former Fianna Fáil Taoiseach Bertie Ahern described Pearse as one of his heroes and displayed a picture of Pearse over his desk in the Department of the Taoiseach.

Pearse's mother Margaret Pearse served as a TD in Dáil Éireann in the 1920s. His sister Margaret Mary Pearse also served as a TD and Senator.

In a 2006 book, psychiatrists Michael Fitzgerald and Antoinette Walker speculated that Pearse had Asperger syndrome. Pearse's apparent "sexual immaturity", and some of his behaviour, has been the subject of comment since the 1970s by historians such as Ruth Dudley Edwards, T. Ryle Dwyer and Sean Farrell Moran, who speculated that he was attracted to young boys. His most recent biographer, Joost Augusteijn, concluded that "it seems most probable that he was sexually inclined this way". Fitzgerald and Walker maintain that there is absolutely no evidence of homosexuality or pedophilia; they allege that Pearse's apparent lack of sexual interest in women, and his "ascetic" and celibate lifestyle are consistent with a diagnosis of high-functioning autism. Cultural historian Elaine Sisson has further said that Pearse's interest in and idealization of young boys needs to be seen in the context of the Victorian era "cult of the boy".

In almost all of Pearse's portraits he struck a sideways pose, concealing his left side. This was to hide a strabismus or squint in his left eye, which he felt was an embarrassing condition.

Commemoration
 The building in Rathfarnham, on the south side of Dublin, that once housed Pearse's school, St Enda's, is now the Pearse Museum.
 Pearse Street and Pearse Square in Dublin were renamed in 1926 in honour of Pearse and his brother Willie, Pearse Street (previously Great Brunswick Street) being their birthplace. Other Pearse Streets can be found in Athlone, Ballina, Bandon, Cahir, Cavan, Clonakilty (formerly Sovereign Street), Gorey, Kilkenny, Kinsale, Mountmellick, Mullingar, Nenagh and Sallynoggin (where there are also Pearse Park, Avenue, Road and other uses of the name).
 There are Pearse Roads in Ardara, County Donegal, Ballyphehane in Cork (which also has Pearse Place and Square), Bray, Cookstown (County Wicklow), Cork, Cranmore (which also has Pearse Crescent and Terrace), Dublin 16, Enniscorthy, Graiguecullen (County Carlow), Letterkenny, Limerick (which also has Pearse Avenue), Sligo and Tralee
 There are Pearse Parks (residential streets) in Drogheda, Dundalk and Tullamore, and (parkland) on the outskirts of Arklow and in Tralee (the former demesne of Tralee Castle). There are other Pearse Avenues in Carrickmacross, Ennis, Mervue in Galway and Mallow. Carrigtwohill has a Patrick Pearse Place and there is a Pearse Bridge in Terenure. There is a Pearse Brothers Park in Rathfarnham and a Pearse Terrace in Westport.
 Longford has Pearse Drive and Pearse View. Crumlin (Dublin) has a Pearse Memorial Park.
 Ballyheigue has a statue built in commemoration.
 Every February, just before the Annual Irish language Dining celebration at King's Inns, the institution hosts an Irish language debate where a Bonn an Phiarsaigh (the Pearse medal) is awarded to the winner.

Educational institutions
Cullenswood House, the Pearse family home in Ranelagh where Pádraic first founded St Enda's, today houses a primary Gaelscoil (school for education through the Irish language) called Lios na nÓg, part of a community-based effort to revive the Irish language. Crumlin (Dublin) has the Pearse College of Further Education, and there was formerly an Irish language summer school in Gaoth Dobhair called Colaiste an Phiarsaigh. In Rosmuc there is an Irish-medium vocational school, Gairmscoil na bPiarsach. The main lecture hall at the Cadet School in Ireland is named after P.H. Pearse.  In September 2014, Gaelcholáiste an Phiarsaigh, a new Irish language medium secondary school, opened its doors for the first time in the former Loreto Abbey buildings, just 1 km from the Pearse Museum in St Endas Park, Rathfarnham. Today Glanmire County Cork boasts the best secondary level Irish speaking college in Ireland called Coláiste an Phiarsaigh, which was named in honour and structured around Patrick Pearse's beliefs.

Sports venues and clubs
A number of Gaelic Athletic Association clubs and playing fields in Ireland are named after Pádraic or both Pearses:
 Antrim: Pearse Park, Dunloy; Patrick Pearse's GAC, Belfast
 Armagh: Annaghmore Pearses GFC; Pearse Óg GAC and its grounds, Pearse Óg Park, Armagh
 Cork: CLG Na Piarsaigh, Cork 
 Derry: Pádraig Pearse's GAC, Kilrea; Pearse's GFC, Waterside, Derry (defunct)
 Donegal: Pearse's Park, Ardara
 Dublin: Ballyboden St. Enda's GAA (called after Pearse's school); Pearse's GAC, Rathfarnham (defunct) 
 Galway: CLG Na Piarsaigh, Ros Muc;Pádraig Pearse's GAC, Ballymacward & Gurteen; Pearse Stadium, Salthill
 Kerry: Dromid Pearses GAC; Kilflynn Pearses HC (defunct)
 Limerick: CLG Na Piarsaigh, Limerick
 Longford: Pearse Park, Longford
 Louth: CPG Na Piarsaigh, Dundalk
 Monaghan: Ballybay Pearse Brothers, and its grounds, Pearse Park
 Roscommon: Pádraig Pearse's GAC
 Tyrone: Pearse Óg GAC, Dregish; Fintona Pearses GAC; and Galbally Pearses GAC, and its grounds, Pearse Park; a defunct club, Leckpatrick Pearse Óg GAC
 Wexford: Naomh Eanna GAA (called after Pearse's school); P.H. Pearse's HC, Enniscorthy (defunct)
 Wicklow: Pearses' Park, Arklow

So also are several outside Ireland:
 Australasia: Pádraig Pearse GAC, Victoria
 London: Brother Pearse's GAC, London
 Scotland: Pearse Park, Glasgow; Pearse Harps HC (defunct)
 Yorkshire: Brothers Pearse GAC, Huddersfield
 North America: Pádraig Pearse GFC, Chicago; Pádraig Pearse GFC, Detroit

There are also soccer clubs named Pearse Celtic FC in Cork and in Ringsend, Dublin; and Liffeys Pearse FC, a south Dublin soccer club formed by the amalgamation of Liffey Wanderers and Pearse Rangers. A Pearse Rangers schoolboy football club remains in existence in Dublin.

Other commemorations
 In 1916 the English composer Arnold Bax, who had met the man, composed a tone poem entitled In Memoriam Patrick Pearse. It received its first public performance in 2008.
 In Belfast the Pearse Club on King Street was wrecked by an explosion in May 1938.
 Westland Row Station in Dublin was renamed Pearse Station in 1966 after the Pearse brothers.
 The silver ten shilling coin minted in 1966 featured the bust of Patrick Pearse. It is the sole Irish coin ever to have featured anyone associated with Irish history or politics.
 In Ballymun the Patrick Pearse Tower was named after him. It was the first of Ballymun's tower blocks to be demolished in 2004.
 In 1999 the centenary of Pearse's induction as a member of the Gorsedd at the 1899 Pan Celtic Eisteddfod in Cardiff (when he took the Bardic name Areithiwr) was marked by the unveiling of a plaque at the Consulate General of Ireland in Wales.
 Postage stamps commemorating Pearse were issued by the Irish postal service in 1966, 1979 and 2008.
 Writer Prvoslav Vujcic is nicknamed Pearse after Patrick Pearse.
 In 2016 Leinster GAA inaugurated a Pearse medal in recognition of Pearse's role as vice president of the province's Colleges' Committee. The medals are awarded to the best footballer and hurler in the Leinster senior championship each year.

Citations

Sources
 Joost Augusteijn, Patrick Pearse: The Making of a Revolutionary, 2009.
 Tim Pat Coogan, Michael Collins. Hutchinson, 1990.
 Ruth Dudley Edwards, Patrick Pearse: the Triumph of Failure, London: Gollancz, 1977.
 F.S.L. Lyons, Ireland Since the Famine. London: Collins/Fontana, 1973.
 Dorothy Macardle, The Irish Republic. Corgi, 1968.
 Arthur Mitchell & Pádraig Ó Snodaigh, Irish Political Documents 1916–1949. Dublin: Irish Academic Press, 1985
 Seán Farrell Moran, Patrick Pearse and the Politics of Redemption: The Mind of the Easter Rising 1916, Washington, Catholic University Press, 1994
"Patrick Pearse and the European Revolt against Reason," in The Journal of the History of Ideas, 50:4 (1989), 625–43
"Patrick Pearse and Patriotic Soteriology: The Irish Republican Tradition and the Sanctification of Political Self-Immolation" in The Irish Terrorism Experience, ed. Yonah Alexander and Alan O'Day, 1991, 9–29
 Brian Murphy, Patrick Pearse and the Lost Republican Ideal, Dublin, James Duffy, 1990.
 Ruán O'Donnell, Patrick Pearse, Dublin: O'Brien Press, 2016
 Mary Pearse, The Home Life of Pádraig Pearse. Cork: Mercier, 1971.
 Patrick Pearse, Short Stories. Trans. Joseph Campbell. Ed. Anne Markey. Dublin: University College Dublin Press, 2009
 Elaine Sisson, "Pearse's Patriots: The Cult of Boyhood at St. Enda's." Cork University Press, 2004, repr. 2005

External links

 Patrick's census information from 1911 while he was still teaching in St. Enda's School
 Patrick's census form part-A
 
 
 The Murder Machine – Pearse's groundbreaking article on contemporary Irish education
 1916 Walking Tour piece on Pearse
 The Poetry of Pádraig Pearse

1879 births
1916 deaths
20th-century Irish dramatists and playwrights
20th-century Irish-language poets
20th-century Irish male writers
Alumni of the Royal University of Ireland
Executed participants in the Easter Rising
Executed writers
Heads of Irish provisional governments
Irish barristers
Irish Catholic poets
Irish male poets
Irish modernist poets
Irish newspaper editors
Irish people of English descent
Irish poets
Irish republicans
Irish revolutionaries
Irish language activists
Irish-language writers
Irish male dramatists and playwrights
Members of the Irish Republican Brotherhood
Patrick
People from Ranelagh
Signatories of the Proclamation of the Irish Republic
Alumni of King's Inns
19th-century Irish businesspeople